Lalbiakhlua Jongte (born 23 July 2002), commonly known as Biaka, is an Indian professional footballer who plays as a goalkeeper for Indian Super League club Hyderabad.

Club career
Born in Mizoram, Jongte was promoted to the Indian Arrows senior squad for 2018–19 I-League. On 28 December 2019, Jongte made his debut in the 2019–20 I-League, against Churchill Brothers.

International career
Jongte started his youth career with the India national under-14 team, and was a regular in the team list. He won the SAFF U-15 Championship with the under-15s in 2017, and qualified for the 2018 AFC U-16 Championship qualification. He then represented India national under-16 football team in the Four Nation Tournament organised at Serbia, where he awarded "Best Goalkeeper of the Tournament", as India won the tournament defeating Tajikistan in the final.

Jongte also won the SAFF U-19 Championship with the India national under-19 football team in 2019.

Career statistics

Club

References

External links

Living people
2002 births
Footballers from Mizoram
Indian footballers
Indian Arrows players
I-League players
Association football goalkeepers
Indian Super League players
Hyderabad FC players
India youth international footballers